First Baptist Church is a Baptist church located in Hackensack, New Jersey. It is a ministry of the Hawthorne Gospel Church. The campus covers a full city block of land and includes a 500-seat worship center, a school offering pre-kindergarten through grade 12, a day camp, and a library. The church formerly had a bookstore and various other ministry as well. At one point the church had nearly 1,500 members.

Beliefs and mission
The mission of First Baptist Church is to glorify God by Worshipping with others as a cooperate body of believers, Growing closer to God and other together, and Serving the surrounding communities.

The beliefs center on these 15 principles:

 The Bible was written by men, supernaturally inspired by God.
 The Bible, God's Word, is 100% true.
 There is only one living and true God.
 The Holy Spirit is a divine person; equal with God the Father and God the Son and of the same nature.
 Literal account of creation found in Genesis.
 Man was created in innocence, but voluntary sinned against God.
 Jesus Christ was begotten of the Holy Ghost in a miraculous manner.
 Salvation of sinners is entirely by grace through faith in Jesus Christ.
 God's grace and free gift of salvation has been made available to all.
 The great gospel blessing, which Christ secures to such as believe in Him, is Justification.
 Repentance and faith are solemn obligation, and also inseparable graces, wrought in our souls by the quickening Spirit of God.
 A church of Christ is a congregation of baptized believers, associated by a covenant of faith and fellowship of the gospel.
 Christian baptism of a believer is the immersion in water into the name of the Father, the Son, and the Holy Spirit.
 There is radical and essential difference between the righteous and the wicked.
 Civil government is of divine appointment for the interests and good order of human society.

History
First Baptist Church was founded on April 7, 1870 when the need for a Baptist church is Hackensack came. In 1916, with 179 members, Dr. Harry C. Leach came to be Senior Pastor. Under his 32 years of leadership, he helped grow the church to 850 members. In 1923, the church constructed the classical church sanctuary. When Dr. Leach retired in 1948, Pastor Joseph M. Stowell came to be the Senior Pastor. He then helped grow the church to nearly 1,400 members. In 1953, the church constructed the Bible School Building, which was able to house 1,000 pupils. Following Pastor Stowell, in 1970, Pastor Robert C. Gage came to be Senior Pastor. Under his leadership, the church began Hackensack Christian Schools, a Pre-K thru 12th grade school. Near the end of his leadership in 1977, the church constructed the Leach Memorial Building, which housed a athletic center, classrooms, and science labs for the Christian School. In 1980, Pastor Gage left to pastor First Baptist Church in the City of New York. In 2017, the school was renamed to Bergen County Christian Academy in order to have a stronger reach into the community.
 
 Original Chapel constructed, 1880
 Current Sanctuary constructed, 1923
 Annual Missionary Conferences, 1946
 Daily Vacation Bible School (reinstituted 1950)
 Bible School Building constructed, 1953
 Lending Library (1953 in the Bible School Building, previously opened in the former chapel)
 Cornerstone Day Camp
 Bergen County Christian Academy (formerly Hackensack Christian School), 1972
 New Life Island, 1972
 Leach Memorial Building constructed, 1977
 Missionary House & Parsonage Duplex constructed, 1997

Bergen County Christian Academy
Bergen County Christian Academy is located on the church campus and has approximately 150 students enrolled in pre-kindergarten through grade 12.

References

External links

Baptist churches in New Jersey
Religious organizations established in 1870
Churches in Bergen County, New Jersey
Hackensack, New Jersey